The Pride of Pawnee is a 1929 American silent Western film directed by Robert De Lacey and starring Tom Tyler, Ethlyne Clair and Barney Furey.

Cast
 Tom Tyler as Kirk Stockton 
 Ethlyne Clair as Madge Wilson 
 Barney Furey as Scotty Wilson 
 Frankie Darro as Jerry Wilson 
 Jack Hilliard as George La Forte 
 Lew Meehan as André Jeel 
 Jimmy Casey as Jeel's Henchman

References

Bibliography
 Darby, William. Masters of Lens and Light: A Checklist of Major Cinematographers and Their Feature Films. Scarecrow Press, 1991.

External links
 

1929 films
1929 Western (genre) films
Films directed by Robert De Lacey
American black-and-white films
Film Booking Offices of America films
Silent American Western (genre) films
1920s English-language films
1920s American films